Gongchangling District is a district of Liaoyang City, Liaoning province, People's Republic of China.

Administrative divisions
There are two subdistricts, one town, and one township within the district.

Subdistricts:
Tuanshanzi Subdistrict, Anping Subdistrict, Sujia Subdistrict

The only town is Tanghe

The only township is Anping Township

References

External links

County-level divisions of Liaoning
Liaoyang